ICCF may stand for:

 International Conference on Cold Fusion, also known as "International Conference on Condensed Matter Nuclear Science"
 International Conservation Caucus Foundation
 International Correspondence Chess Federation
  International Child Care Fund, a charitable organization started by Bram Moolenaar, the author of the text editor Vim
 VSE/Interactive Computing and Control Facility (VSE/ICCF), an interactive text editor & script language susbsytem for the IBM VSE Operating System and its successors.